Xiaogan North railway station is a railway station located in Dawu County, Xiaogan, Hubei Province, China. Despite its name, the station is located in Dawu County, almost 100km away from downtown Xiaogan. It serves the Shijiazhuang–Wuhan high-speed railway, a segment of the Harbin–Hong Kong (Macau) corridor, and the Beijing-Guangzhou-Shenzhen-Hong Kong High-Speed Railway. It was opened on 28 September 2012.

Railway stations in Hubei
Stations on the Shijiazhuang–Wuhan High-Speed Railway